The Hundred Islands National Park  is the first Philippine national park and a protected area located in Alaminos, Pangasinan. Only four of them have been developed for tourism: Marcos Island, Governor Island, Quezon Island, and Children's Island.

Geology

The islands are believed to be about two million years old. There are actually ancient corals that extend well inland, in an area previously comprising the seabed of an ancient sea.  The lowering of the sea level have exposed them to the surface.  The peculiar "mushroom-like" shapes of some of the islands were caused by the eroding action of ocean waves.

History
The Republic Act No. 3655 signed on June 22, 1962, created the Hundred Islands Conservation and Development Authority (HICDA), for the conservation, development and management of HINP. The park including Lucap Bay was transferred from HICDA to the Philippine Tourism Authority (PTA) by virtue of Section 35 of Presidential Decree No. 564.

On April 27, 1982, under Proclamation No. 2183, the national park including Lucap Bay and its foreshore areas, beginning from Sitio Telbang to the east to Sitio Recudo to the west, were declared as a Tourist Zone and Marine Reserve under the control and administration of the PTA.  Subsequently, under the Presidential Proclamation No. 2237 enacted on November 6, 1982, the parcels of land reserve for the Marine Fisheries Multi-Purpose Farm (created under Proclamation No. 1282 of June 21, 1974) were withdrawn and were also placed under the control and supervision of the Tourism Authority for development purposes.

The Executive Order No. 436 signed by President Gloria Macapagal Arroyo on June 21, 2005, transferred the administration, management, maintenance, and operation of the whole Hundred Islands National Park (HINP), including all the activities, facilities, and improvements thereafter, from the Philippine Tourism Authority (PTA) to the city government of Alaminos, Pangasinan in pursuit of Republic Act No. 7160, otherwise known as the Local Government Code of 1991, which encouraged the transfer of power and authority from the national government to local government units, in line with the government's devolution program mandated by the Constitution.

Fauna
The Sagip Lingayen Gulf Project is a study done in 2010, implemented by the Marine Environment and Resources Foundation Inc. and funded by the Dutch government, in response to the lack of resources on the terrestrial wildlife of the islands. The study assessed and created an inventory of the flora and fauna of the islands to help the city government create an environmental monitoring program to protect the island's biodiversity.

The wildlife in this place includes bird such as the Philippine duck, white-eared brown-dove, Philippine hawk-cuckoo, Philippine coucal, Philippine bulbul, elegant tit, lemon-throated leaf-warbler, and the grey-backed tailorbird; fish such as thresher sharks, angelfish, and butterflyfish; and crustaceans such as ghost crabs and hermit crabs.

See also

List of islands of the Philippines
List of national parks of the Philippines
List of protected areas of the Philippines

References

External links

Hundred Islands National Park – Tourism Philippines

1940 establishments in the Philippines
Islands of Pangasinan
National parks of the Philippines
Protected areas established in 1940
Tourist attractions in Pangasinan